Dorina Irena-Rita Mitrea (born April 30, 1965) is a Romanian-American mathematician known for her work in harmonic analysis, partial differential equations, and the theory of distributions, and in mathematics education. She is a professor of mathematics and chair of the mathematics department at Baylor University.

Education and career
Mitrea earned a master's degree in 1987 from the University of Bucharest. Her thesis, Riemann’s Theorem for Simply Connected Riemann Surfaces, was supervised by Cabiria Andreian Cazacu. She completed her Ph.D. in 1996 from the University of Minnesota. Her dissertation, Layer Potential Operators and Boundary Value Problems for Differential Forms on Lipschitz Domains, was supervised by Eugene Barry Fabes.

Mitrea joined the University of Missouri mathematics faculty in 1996, and became M. & R. Houchins Distinguished Professor of Mathematics at the University of Missouri in 2016. She moved to Baylor as professor and chair in 2019.

Books
Mitrea is the author of:
Layer Potentials, the Hodge Laplacian, and Global Boundary Problems in Nonsmooth Riemannian Manifolds (with Marius Mitrea and Michael E. Taylor, Memoirs of the American Mathematical Society, 2001)
Calculus Connections: Mathematics for Middle School Teachers (with Asma Harcharras, Pearson Prentice Hall, 2007)
Distributions, Partial Differential Equations, and Harmonic Analysis (Universitext, Springer, 2013; 2nd ed., 2018)
Groupoid Metrization Theory: With Applications to Analysis on Quasi-Metric Spaces and Functional Analysis (with Irina Mitrea, Marius Mitrea, and Sylvie Monniaux, Birkhäuser, 2013)
The Hodge-Laplacian: Boundary Value Problems on Riemannian Manifolds (with Irina Mitrea, Marius Mitrea, and Michael E. Taylor, De Gruyter, 2016)
-Square Function Estimates on Spaces of Homogeneous Type and on Uniformly Rectifiable Sets (with Steve Hofmann, Marius Mitrea, and Andrew J. Morris, Memoirs of the American Mathematical Society, 2017)

Personal life
Mitrea is married to Marius Mitrea. Her husband is also a mathematician, and moved with Mitrea from Missouri to Baylor.

References

External links

1965 births
Living people
20th-century American mathematicians
21st-century American mathematicians
American women mathematicians
Romanian mathematicians
Functional analysts
Mathematics educators
University of Minnesota alumni
University of Missouri faculty
Mathematicians from Missouri
Baylor University faculty
20th-century American women
21st-century American women